Bosniakisation designates the process of ethnic and cultural assimilation of non-Bosniak individuals or groups into the Bosniak ethnocultural corpus. Historically, bosniakisation was directed mainly towards some other South Slavic groups, like ethnic Muslims (Muslimani) in former Yugoslavia. Since Bosniaks are Sunni Muslims, Bosniakisation was also manifested towards some distinctive ethnoreligious minorities within Serbian and Croatian national corpus, mainly towards Serbian Muslims and Croatian Muslims.

History
This process was initiated in Bosnia and Herzegovina, originally during the period of Austro-Hungarian administration (1878–1918), when the first political projects were designed to create an integral "Bosnian", and then a special "Bosniak" nation. An integral "Bosnian" project proved to be unachievable even during the Austro-Hungarian administration, since not only the Bosnian Serbs, but also the Bosnian Croatians gave a determined resistance to the creation of an integral "Bosnian" nation. Therefore, the focus was transferred to a special "Bosniak" project, which acquired a certain foothold in the Bosnian-Herzegovinian governor. The key role in the design and implementation of these projects was played by Austro-Hungarian Minister Benjamin Kalai, who from 1882 to 1903 was responsible for Bosnia and Herzegovina.

As a foothold for Bosniak ethnogenesis and history, Bogomilism and a non-Slavic origin had been contrived. Then after the direct influence of the Ottoman Conquest, a cultural identity was imposed (through the process of Islamization). This gave to the ultimate expression of a Bosniak specificity, which has led to the religious doctrine of ethnos. The Bosniak project was restarted at the time of the breakup of Yugoslavia, when Yugoslavian Muslims decided to rename themselves ethnic "Bosniaks". This process initially affected much of Bosnia and Herzegovina, and then spread to northeastern Montenegro and southwestern Serbia, including the Raška region, as well as parts of Kosovo and Metohija. 

Bosniakisation was often manifested through cultural and educational programs. In 1996, the Atlantic Council of the United States noted that "Non-Muslims in Sarajevo, Tuzla, and other areas under Bosniak control feel increasingly alienated in their own communities as a result of a wide array of government decisions, from the "Bosniakization" of the school curriculum". Specific forms of Bosniakisation were also integrated into linguistic policy, and perception of regional history.

Sandžak
Sandžak is a very ethnically diverse region. Most Muslims declared themselves ethnic Muslims in 1991 census. By the 2002-2003 census, however, most of them declared themselves Bosniaks. There is still a significant minority that identify simply as Muslims (by ethnicity).

The second half of the 19th century was very important in terms of shaping the current ethnic and political situation in Sandžak. Austria-Hungary supported Sandžak's separation from the Ottoman Empire, or at least its autonomy within it. The reason was to prevent Serbia and Montenegro from unifying, and allow Austria-Hungary's further expansion to the Balkans. Per these plans, Sandžak was seen as part of Bosnia and Herzegovina, while its Muslim population played a significant role giving Austrian-Hungarians a pretext of protecting the Muslim minority from the Christian Orthodox Serbs.

There were a larger presence of Albanians in Sandžak in the past, however due to various factors such as migration, assimilation, along with mixing, many identify as Bosniaks instead.

Insisting on the imposition of Bosniaks and the spreading of a Bosniak project outside of Bosnia, a controversy erupted on the part of Yugoslav ethnic Muslims primarily in Serbia and Montenegro. In opposing the imposition of Bosniaks, president of the Muslim Matica in Montenegro, Dr. Avdul Kurpejović explicitly stressed in 2014 that the "Greater Bosniak Nationalist, Islamic Assimilation Program" is based exactly on the Islamic Declaration of Alija Izetbegović. 

In 1700, after the Great Serb Migration, the Albanian Kelmendi and Kuçi and other Albanian tribes like the Shkreli of Rugova established themselves in the region of Rožaje and the neighboring town of Tutin in Serbia. The Shala, Krasniqi, and Gashi also moved into the region. Starting in the 18th century many people originating from the Hoti tribe have migrated to and live in Sandžak, mainly in the Tutin area, but also in Sjenica. Catholic Albanian groups which settled in Tutin in the early 18th century were converted to Islam in that period. Their descendants make up the large majority of the population of Tutin and the Pešter plateau.

Members of the Shkreli (known as Škrijelj /) and Kelmendi (known as Klimenti /) beginning around 1700  migrated into the lower Pešter and Sandžak regions. The Kelmendi chief had converted to Islam, and promised to convert his people as well. A total of 251 Kelmendi households (1,987 people) were resettled in the Pešter area on that occasion, however five years later a part of the exiled Kelmendi managed to fight their way back to their homeland, and in 1711 they sent out a large raiding force to bring back some other from Pešter too. The remaining Kelmendi and Shkreli converted to Islam and became Slavophones by the 20th century, and as of today they now self-identify as part of the Bosniak ethnicity, although in the Pešter plateau they partly utilized the Albanian language until the middle of the 20th century. There are still some Albanian villages in the Pešter region: Ugao, Boroštica, Doliće and Gradac.  Factors such as some intermarriage undertaken by two generations with the surrounding (Muslim) Bosniak population along with the difficult circumstances of the Yugoslav wars (1990s) made local Albanians opt to refer to themselves in censuses as Bosniaks. Elders in the villages still have a degree of fluency in the language.

The Slavic dialect of Gusinje and Plav (sometimes considered part of Sandžak) shows very high structural influence from Albanian. Its uniqueness in terms of language contact between Albanian and Slavic is explained by the fact that most Slavic-speakers in today's Plav and Gusinje are of Albanian origin.

Gora
A number of Gorani people were a subject of Bosniakisation in recent history.

See also

 Bosniaks
 Bosniak nationalism
 Muslims (ethnic group)
 Gorani people 
 Serbs of Bosnia and Herzegovina
 Serbisation
 Croats of Bosnia and Herzegovina
 Croatisation

References

Literature 

 
 
 
 
 
 
 
 
 
 
 
 
 
 

Bosniak people
Bosnian War
Social history of Bosnia and Herzegovina
Cultural assimilation